The Georgia Department of Natural Resources (DNR) is an administrative agency of the U.S. state of Georgia. The agency has statewide responsibilities for managing and conserving Georgia’s natural, cultural, and historical resources, and has five divisions:

Coastal Resources Division 
Environmental Protection Division 
Law Enforcement Division 
Parks, Recreation & Historic Sites
Wildlife Resources Division 

The DNR is headed by a commissioner, currently Mark Williams. The department's Board of Natural Resources is composed of 18 citizens who oversee rulemaking for the agency.  Members are appointed by the governor and approved by the state senate. The Historic Preservation Division was transferred from the DNR to the Department of Community Affairs in 2020.

The Law Enforcement Division has the Rank Structure of:

Colonel
Lieutenant Colonel 
Major
Captain
Lieutenant 
Sergeant 
Corporal 
Game Warden First Class
Game Warden Second Class
Game Warden II 
Game Warden I
Probationary Game Warden 
Recruit

Mission

The mission of the Georgia Department of Natural Resources is to sustain, enhance, protect and conserve Georgia’s natural, historic and cultural resources for present and future generations, while recognizing the importance of promoting the development of commerce and industry that utilize sound environmental practices.

See also

Geologic map of Georgia - Produced by the Georgia Department of Natural Resources
List of State Fish and Wildlife Management Agencies in the U.S.
List of law enforcement agencies in Georgia

References

External links
Georgia Department of Natural Resources

State law enforcement agencies of Georgia (U.S. state)
Natural Resources, Georgia Department of
State environmental protection agencies of the United States
Natural resources agencies in the United States
Maritime law enforcement agencies of the United States